Chad Allen or Allan may refer to:

Chad Allen (actor) (born 1974), American actor known for his role on Dr. Quinn: Medicine Woman
Chad Allen (baseball) (born 1975), baseball outfielder formerly with the Minnesota Twins
Chad Allan (musician) (born 1943), originally Allan Kowbel, Canadian guitarist, singer and television host
Chad Allen (curler), Canadian curler